Rashkan Castle was a castle in Tehran Province in northern Iran. It was located near Cheshmeh Ali, Shah-Abdol-Azim shrine and Fath Ali shah inscription (Cheshmeh-Ali). The castle was intended to hold Rey, Iran. Rashkan castle was erected with plaster of lime and ashes or sand with stones. It was built during the Parthian rule of Persia.

Etymology
The name comes from Arsaces I of Parthia, the first king of the Parthians. Some of the war items found there are now  housed  in the National Museum of Iran.

See Also 

 Rey Castle
 Fath Ali Shah Inscription

References

Castles in Iran
Parthian castles
Buildings and structures in Tehran Province

National works of Iran
Ruined castles in Iran
Parthian architecture